Margomunda is a village in Margomunda CD block in the Madhupur subdivision of the Deoghar district in the Indian state of Jharkhand.

Geography

Location

Overview
The map shows a large area, which is a plateau with low hills, except in the eastern portion where the Rajmahal hills intrude into this area and the Ramgarh hills are there. The south-western portion is just a rolling upland. The entire area is overwhelmingly rural with only small pockets of urbanisation.

Note: The full screen map is interesting. All places marked on the map are linked in the full screen map and one can easily move on to another page of his/her choice. Enlarge the full screen map to see what else is there – one gets railway connections, many more road connections and so on.

Area

Demographics
According to the 2011 Census of India, Margomunda had a total population of 1,680, of which 871 (52%) were males and 809 (48%) were females. Population in the age range 0–6 years was 271. The total number of literate persons in Margomunda was 1,409 (64.23% of the population over 6 years).

Civic administration

Police station
There is a police station at Margomunda village.

CD block HQ
Headquarters of Margomunda CD block is at Margomunda village.

Education
Rajkiyakrit High School Margomunda is a Hindi-medium coeducational institution established in 1978. It has facilities for teaching in class IX and X.

References

Villages in Deoghar district